Eila Eskola-Kyröläinen (28 June 1931 – 20 July 2015) was a Finnish sprint canoeist who competed in the late 1950s and early 1960s. Competing in two Summer Olympics, she earned her best finish of ninth in the K-1 500 m event at Rome in 1960. She was born in Ruovesi.

References
Eila Eskola-Kyröläinen's profile at Sports Reference.com

1931 births
2015 deaths
People from Ruovesi
Canoeists at the 1956 Summer Olympics
Canoeists at the 1960 Summer Olympics
Finnish female canoeists
Olympic canoeists of Finland
Sportspeople from Pirkanmaa